In road transport, a yield or give way sign indicates that merging drivers must prepare to stop if necessary to let a driver on another approach proceed. A driver who stops or slows down to let another vehicle through has yielded the right of way to that vehicle. In contrast, a stop sign requires each driver to stop completely before proceeding, whether or not other traffic is present. Under the Vienna Convention on Road Signs and Signals, the international standard for the modern sign is an inverted equilateral triangle with a red border and either a white or yellow background. Particular regulations regarding appearance, installation, and compliance with the signs vary by some jurisdiction.

Terminology
While give way and yield essentially have the same meaning in this context, many countries have a clear preference of one term over the other. The following table lists which countries and territories use which term. This chart is based on official government usage in the English language and excludes indirect translations from other languages.

History

A black triangle (within the standard down-arrow-shape of stop signs) was a symbol of "stop for all vehicles" from about 1925 in Germany. The triangular yield sign was used as early as 1937, when it was introduced in Denmark in red and white (matching the Danish flag), in 1938 when it was codified in Czechoslovakia in a blue-white variant without words, and in 1939 in the Protectorate of Bohemia and Moravia which adopted the current red-white variant. 
In the United States, the first yield sign was erected in 1950 in Tulsa, Oklahoma, designed by Tulsa police officer Clinton Riggs; Riggs invented only the sign, not the rule, which was already in place. Riggs' original design was shaped like a keystone; later versions bore the shape of an inverted equilateral triangle in common use today. The inverted equilateral triangle was then adopted by the Vienna Convention on Road Signs and Signals as the international standard.

Country specifics

Australia
In Australia, the Give Way sign evolved similarly to its counterpart in the United States. During the 1940s and 1950s, the sign was circular and yellow. In 1964, the sign changed to a red triangle. In the 1980s, the sign adopted its modern design and gained a counterpart for use at roundabouts.

Ireland
Signs erected between 1962 and 1997 read , which remains legally permitted. Signs 1956–62 had a blank white interior.

New Zealand
In New Zealand, the original design also used the keystone shape as in the United States but used a black background with a red border. In the 1980s, the modern design was adopted. On sealed roads, the give way sign is always accompanied by a white line painted on the road to clarify the rule to road users even if the sign is obscured or missing.

United Kingdom

The United Kingdom's Road Traffic Act calls for  signs and road markings at junctions (crossroads) where the give-way rule is to apply. The road marking accompanying the sign consists of a large inverted triangle painted just before the place to give way, which is marked by broken white lines across the road.

In Wales, some signs bear a bilingual legend: the Welsh  appears above .

United States
In the Federal Highway Administration's Manual on Uniform Traffic Control Devices, a yield sign may be warranted

The sign went through several changes from its original design to the sign used today. Originally invented in 1952 and added to the MUTCD in 1954, the sign used the "keystone" shape before adopting the more readily recognized triangular shape. In 1971, the sign evolved into its modern version and changed from yellow to red, paralleling the same change that had earlier been made by Stop signs.

Other countries
Most countries around the world use a red and white vertical triangle with no text.
Finland, Greece, Iceland, Kuwait, Poland, Sweden and Vietnam uses a red and yellow version of the sign.
United Kingdom, British Overseas Territories and Crown Dependencies, Bhutan and most Commonwealth nations use a version of the sign that says 
Australia, Papua New Guinea, Tonga and Vanuatu use a different version of the sign which has an advance sign typeface and a different font. 
Dominica uses a version of the British sign with "Give Way" text in red.
Fiji, New Zealand, and Samoa use a version of the sign with "Give Way" in the type of road sign font used in the United States and in red.
Liberia uses a version of the sign that says  in red text and in a different font.
Nigeria uses a red and yellow version of the Give Way sign used in the UK and many other Commonwealth nations.
Singapore uses a UK-Inspired Give Way sign placed inside a white round square.
The United States uses a Yield sign where the white triangle is smaller and says  in red.
Canada uses a version of the international standard triangle sign without any words.
Argentina, Bolivia, Ecuador, Mexico, Paraguay, Peru and Uruguay use  except Colombia, Costa Rica, Dominican Republic, El Salvador, Nicaragua, Panama and Venezuela, which use a version of the sign with smaller text and in a different font.
Cuba uses a red and yellow version of the Spanish Give Way sign.
Puerto Rico uses a version of the American Yield sign translated into Spanish which says .

Gallery

Signs with text in English

Signs with text in Spanish

Signs with text in other languages

See also
Stop sign
Traffic sign

References

External links

 Gallery of Stop and Yield Signs

Traffic signs